Don Blum (born May 12, 1972 in Ann Arbor, Michigan) is a musician, best known as the drummer for the  Indie rock band The Von Bondies.  Blum lives in Ann Arbor, Michigan. He was first interested in drums at the age of 14.

Discography

The Von Bondies
2001 - "Lack of Communication" (Sympathy For The Record Industry)
2003 - "Raw and Rare" (Intheact Records/Dim Mak Records)
2004 - "Pawn Shoppe Heart" (Sire Records, 2004)
2009 - "Love, Hate, and Then There's You" (Majordomo Records)

Freddy & the Four-Gone Conclusions
2002 - "Wigged Out Sounds" (Get Hip Recordings)

References

Living people
1972 births
Musicians from Ann Arbor, Michigan
20th-century American drummers
American male drummers
21st-century American drummers
20th-century American male musicians
21st-century American male musicians